Aquatics at the 1969 Southeast Asian Peninsular Games included swimming, diving, and waterpolo events. The sports of aquatics were held in Rangoon, Burma. Aquatics events was held between 10 December to 13 December.

Swimming
Men's events

Women's events

Diving

Waterpolo

References

1969
1969 Southeast Asian Peninsular Games